The Brazilian shrew mouse (Blarinomys breviceps), also known as the blarinine akodont, is a rodent in the tribe Akodontini from the Atlantic Forest of eastern and southeastern Brazil. It is the only species in the genus Blarinomys. Phylogenetic analysis suggest that there are two clear geographical clades, a northeastern and southeastern.

Morphology 
The appearance of the Brazilian shrew mouse is often compared to that of small insectivorous shrews or moles with small, reduced eyes, short ears and tail, and short, soft fur. Its mole-like appearance contributes to its ability to be differentiated from other rodents in its Neotropical habitat. Overall, its specialized body structure lends itself to the animal's subterranean life, with broad forefeet and large claws for digging. It has a long snout that is used to find insects in the ground and highly developed jaw muscles that help to close the mouth quickly, as to avoid swallowing dirt. The species has demonstrated sexual dimorphism in that females are usually slightly larger than males.

Lifespan 
The average lifespan of the Brazilian shrew mouse is unknown, as they are difficult to find. Captive specimens tend to refuse food and die shortly after capture. It is generally assumed that the species' lifespan is similar to other Sigmodontinae rodents, which is typically less than one year.

Diet 
Very little is known about the diet of B. breviceps, however it is assumed to be primarily insectivorous. When studied in captivity, many specimens refuse food and die within a few days. However, some captive organisms have been shown to eat a variety of insects including crickets, moths and butterflies, and roaches. Overall, they tend to refuse other food sources such as fruits or seeds.

Conservation status 
According to the International Union for Conservation of Nature's Red List of Endangered Species, the Brazilian shrew mouse is considered of least concern. However, some experts suggest that since the species is so difficult to find, data is insufficient to confidently label their conservation status.

References

Literature cited
Duff, A. and Lawson, A. 2004. Mammals of the World: A checklist. New Haven, Connecticut: Yale University Press, 312 pp. 
Hildebrand, M. 1985. Digging in Quadrupeds. Functional Vertebrate Morphology. Harvard University Press. Pp. 89-109.
Matson, JO and Abravaya, JP. 1977. Blarinomys breviceps. Mammalian Species (74): 1. doi:10.2307/3503793. ISSN 0076-3519.
Missagia, R. and Perini, F. 2018. Skull morphology of the Brazilian shrew mouse Blarinomys breviceps (Akodontini; Sigmodontinae), with comparative notes on Akodontini rodents. Zoologischer Anzeiger. 277. 10.1016/j.jcz.2018.09.005.
Musser, G.G. and Carleton, M.D. 2005. Superfamily Muroidea. Pp. 894–1531 in Wilson, D.E. and Reeder, D.M. (eds.). Mammal Species of the World: a taxonomic and geographic reference. 3rd ed. Baltimore: The Johns Hopkins University Press, 2 vols., 2142 pp. 
Nowak, R. 1999. Walker's Mammals of the World, vol. II. Baltimore and London: The Johns Hopkins University Press.
Pardinas, U., Patterson, B., D'Elia, G. and Teta, P. 2008. . In IUCN. IUCN Red List of Threatened Species. Version 2009.2. <www.iucnredlist.org>. Downloaded on February 4, 2010.
Ventura, K., Sato-Kuwabara, Y., Fagundes, V., Geise, L., Leite, Y., Costa, L., Silva, M., Yonenaga-Yassuda, Y., Rodrigues, M. 2012. Phylogeographic Structure and Karyotypic Diversity of the Brazilian Shrew Mouse (Blarinomys breviceps, Sigmodontinae) in the Atlantic Forest. Cytogenetic and Genome Research. 138 (1): 19–30. 
Zamorano A and Eston MR. 2010. Registro de Blarinomys breviceps (Winge, 1888) (Cricetidae, Rodentia) no Parque Estadual Carlos Botelho – SP (Nota Científica). A record of Brazilian shrew-mouse Blarinomys breviceps (Winge, 1888) (Cricetidae, Rodentia) in Carlos Botelho State Park – SP, Brazil (Scientific Note). Instituto Florestal. OCLC 860212699

Mammals of Brazil
Akodontini
Mammals described in 1888
Taxa named by Herluf Winge